Woman's World was a lifestyle program that ran for more than two decades on WKRG-TV channel 5 in Mobile, Alabama. It was hosted by Connie Bea Hope and Estella Payton. It aired at noontime and lasted for 30 minutes. The show included guest appearances and interviews.

Show history
Hope joined WKRG from its inception in September 1955 and began hosting Connie's Cupboard with Bea Hope, with Estelle Payton (1904–1999) as her assistant. In the early years, Payton, an African American, did not appear on camera unless her hands slipped into the shot while setting up or removing utensils. Later, in the 1960s, Payton began to appear on air. She was eventually given third billing on the program's opening titles, given her own microphone, and occasionally offered comments on Hope's demonstrations.

The show aired at the same time and in direct competition with Gulf Coast Today, a local women's show on WALA-TV hosted by Dot Moore. Woman's World was included in the Mobile Chamber of Commerce article celebrating WKRG's 50th anniversary, where it was listed as one of the TV station's favorite shows from the channel's early days of broadcast. Notable guests on the program included well-known celebrities, such as Michael Landon.

A columnist suggested in 2006 that the show was an example of Mobile's progressivity in race relations.

References

Additional sources
Herman W. Land Associates Inc. Television and the Wired City a Study of the Implications of a Change in the Mode of Transmission 1968, July (1111) ASIN: B000RL0X18 
Archival video footage of the show (bottom of page)

1950s American cooking television series
1960s American cooking television series
1970s American cooking television series
1980s American cooking television series
1955 American television series debuts
1981 American television series endings
Local television programming in the United States
History of women in Alabama